John Gordon Stackhouse Jr. (born 1960) is a Canadian scholar of religion. As a journalist he has been recognized with over a dozen awards by the Canadian Church Press, and his scholarship has been supported by research grants from the Social Sciences and Humanities Research Council of Canada, the Association of Theological Schools, the Canadian Embassy to the United States, and several other sponsors. He currently teaches at Crandall University in Moncton, New Brunswick.

Early life 
Stackhouse was born in 1960 in Kingston, Ontario, Canada, and raised in southwestern England and northern Ontario, the eldest of four children. His father, John G. Stackhouse, was a general surgeon trained at Queen's University and in Plymouth, Devon, UK, who eventually earned fellowships from the Royal College of Surgeons in Canada, the American College of Surgeons, and the International College of Surgeons. His mother, A. Yvonne (Annan) Stackhouse, was a schoolteacher and later university instructor, with degrees in English literature from Nipissing University and Hardin-Simmons University. She received an honorary doctorate from the latter institution for her work as a teacher, board member, and author of the university's centennial history.

John Jr. received his higher education in Canada and the United States: after a year at Mount Carmel Bible School in Edmonton, he received a BA (First Class Honours, Queen’s University, Kingston) in history, an MA (with Highest Honors, Wheaton College) in church history and theology (with a thesis supervised by Mark A. Noll), and a PhD (University of Chicago) in the history and theology of Christianity (with a dissertation supervised by Martin E. Marty).

Career 
Stackhouse began teaching at the International Teams School of World Missions and then Wheaton College, both in suburban Chicago, during his doctoral studies. His first full-time position was as an assistant professor of European history at Northwestern College in Orange City, Iowa (1987–90), where he chaired the department in his latter two years and won the college's teaching award. From there, he went to teach Modern Christianity (history, sociology, philosophy, and theology) in the Department of Religion at the University of Manitoba, in Winnipeg, Manitoba, Canada, rising to the rank of Professor in 1997 and receiving the university's top awards for research and for outreach to the community (via his newspaper column and other media appearances). One year later, he left for Regent College in Vancouver (1998–2015), where he served as the Sangwoo Youtong Chee Professor of Theology and Culture at Regent College, in the position formerly held by J. I. Packer.

In 2015, Stackhouse headed east to become the inaugural Samuel J. Mikolaski Professor of Religious Studies at Crandall University and that university's first Dean of Faculty Development, in which latter role he mentors junior faculty and equips mid-career colleagues in teaching and scholarship. In 2018 he received that university's Stephen and Ella Steeves Award for Excellence in Research and in 2023 received that Award for Excellence in Service.

Stackhouse appeared on the editorial masthead of Christianity Today from 1994 until 2018, and served as a contributing editor for Books & Culture and Christian History & Biography magazines. He is a former columnist with Christian Week and the Winnipeg Free Press, and resumed his column with Faith Today in 2009. He served as senior advisor to the Centre for Research on Canadian Evangelicalism from its genesis in 2008 to 2010. He wrote over 200 weekly web columns for "Context: Beyond the Headlines," a leading Canadian Christian public affairs television program, until 2020. He now writes occasionally for the Religion News Service, "Sightings" (produced at the University of Chicago Divinity School), and other media. He also serves on the editorial board of the Anglican Journal in Canada and as a Fellow of the Centre for Public Christianity in Australia.

Stackhouse's writing has ranged over theology, ethics, the history of Christianity, and both the sociology and philosophy of religion. He has published more than 30 academic journal articles, the same number of full-length chapters in academic books, and more than 900 other articles, columns, book chapters, and reviews. He has edited four books of academic theology, authored eleven books, and co-authored four more. He is listed in Canadian Who's Who, The Directory of American Scholars, and Contemporary Authors. He has given expert testimony to the Canada Revenue Agency, the Manitoba Human Rights Commission, and the British Columbia Supreme Court. He has lectured at dozens of colleges and universities, including Harvard's Kennedy School, Yale Divinity School, Stanford Law School, Fudan University (Shanghai), Hong Kong University, New College, Edinburgh, the University of Otago, and Canadian universities from coast to coast. He has also given over 1000 media interviews, including to CBC TV and radio, CTV, Global TV, and Vision TV in Canada; ABC TV News, NBC TV News, PBS, and Religion News Service in the US; and ABC national TV and radio in Australia—as well as to major periodicals such as The New York Times, The Washington Post, The Globe and Mail, The National Post, Time, and Maclean's.

Themes in Scholarship 

Stackhouse has advanced several key ideas in each of his monographs. 

In Canadian Evangelicalism, he disputed the previous scholarly portrait of evangelicals as a combination of fundamentalists (such as T. T. Shields) and eccentric radio preachers and politicians (such as William Aberhart). By examining the histories of seven leading evangelical institutions, Stackhouse showed that fundamentalism was not in fact a major factor in Canadian evangelicalism and that instead Canadian evangelicals were a generally cohesive fellowship of orthodox, vital Protestants both within mainline denominations and in their own uniformly evangelical denominations. He also distinguished two mentalités, what he called “churchish” and “sectish” (punning on classic sociological categories), to indicate a more or less favourable and comfortable engagement with Canadia culture among evangelicals, outlooks that sometimes occurred and even clashed within evangelical institutions.

In Can God Be Trusted?, Stackhouse surveys the conventional arguments for the orthodox Christian view of God in the face of evil only to observe that the figure of Jesus Christ is strangely absent from most high-level contributions to this discourse. The second half of the book then explores what it would mean to take Jesus thoroughly into account, a prospect that revises the key question from “Why does God govern the world as God does?” to “Can God be trusted to govern the world as God does?” Jesus provides the intellectual, existential, and religious grounds to answer the latter question affirmatively, even as a comprehensive answer to the former remains elusive—and perhaps both impossible and even unhelpful.

In Humble Apologetics, Stackhouse parts with much of his evangelical confraternity to maintain that apologetics—the defending and commending of the Christian faith—ought to focus on helping people convert to Christianity and to grow up into maturity within it, rather than to assert Christian intellectual superiority over all comers as a form of what he calls “martial arts.” Apologetics thus can be helpful for both inquirers and believers so long as it is a discourse of love—offering the gift of cogent explanation and warrant for the Christian Story—rather than, as it too often is, a discourse of battle. Stackhouse also shows how wide the range of apologetics should be: well beyond theological and philosophical disputation to include literature, art, friendship, worship, and more.

In Finally Feminist—and in its revised version, Partners in Christ¬—Stackhouse sets out a different way of considering Scripture and church history from the “redemptive trajectory” model common among his fellow Biblical feminists. The latter model suggests a sort of rising feminism through the course of the Bible that extends upward to our own day such that explicit feminism now makes proper sense of the Bible’s implicit feminism two millennia ago. Stackhouse instead argues for a doubleness in Scripture: simultaneously a patriarchalism that shows up from the Torah to Paul’s own ministry (including, controversially, Jesus’ ministry as well) and yet also an egalitarianism that is also evident throughout the Bible. Stackhouse accounts for this doubleness in terms of what he calls “Holy Spirit pragmatism.” God works with people, including whole cultures, according to our capacity for change. Since patriarchy is a universal, and baleful, effect of the Fall, God’s work with his people—in Israel at first, and then with the Church in the New Testament—temporarily condones patriarchy (as the Bible does also, for instance, the reprehensible institution of slavery) while also asserting the fundamental equality of dignity and capability of women (and, indeed, of slaves). Thus women generally are treated better in Israel and the early Church better than in contemporary contexts. Moreover, while the early church could hardly practice gender equality without that becoming such a scandal as to smother the Church in its cradle, the theological seeds are sown for later recognition of women’s full equality in social contexts (namely, the modern) in which such recognition could be plausible and then fully acceptable. Stackhouse’s construal thus takes the ambiguity in the Biblical material more fully into account—in both Leviticus and Ephesians, for instance—while also preserving modern Biblical feminists from the odium of casting implicit aspersions on all previous generations of Christians as hopelessly sexist as well as terrible Bible interpreters.

In Making the Best of It—and, in a more accessible book on similar questions, Why You’re Here—Stackhouse ventures a fundamental Christian ethics, a theology of culture in a Christian realist mode informed by C. S. Lewis, Dietrich Bonhoeffer, and the two Niebuhrs, but also by more recent writers such as Oliver O'Donovan, Richard Bauckham, Jean Bethke Elshtain, David Martin, and perhaps especially Glenn Tinder. He thus positions himself outside the two most popular forms of academic Christian ethics—neo-Kantian liberalism and neo-Anabaptist pacifism—and argues at length especially with the latter, as the more attractive in his own evangelical circles. Stackhouse argues that God has given humanity the central vocation of making shalom—by loving God, loving one’s neighbour, and loving the rest of creation—and has called Christians to the special work of calling people to discipleship to Jesus Christ. Thus Christians help others follow Jesus back to God and forward to the world to come, in which world—not an ethereal heaven, but a renewed planet (“Earth 2.0”)—we will “reign with him,” which is to say, continue our permanent vocation of cultivating the cosmos in partnership with God and each other. Stackhouse’s key ethical teaching is a deontology when the situation is clear (which is, he acknowledges, most of the time) and a consequentialism (heavily influenced by Bonhoeffer’s later writings) when it isn’t. “Maximize shalom” is the epitome of this ethic: “Everything, everywhere, every moment.”

In Need to Know, Stackhouse sets out a basic model for Christian thinking, in answer to the basic question, “How should a Christian think?” Drawing especially on so-called Reformed epistemology (the book is dedicated to Nicholas Wolterstorff), with inspiration also from Thomas Reid and Michael Polanyi, Stackhouse argues for an existential understanding of Christian thought as a function of discipleship to Jesus. Rather, that is, than simply following a scheme—although Stackhouse sets one out, in terms of drawing on five main sources: experience, tradition, scholarship, art, and Scripture—the Christian properly tries to listen to Jesus guide him or her via the Holy Spirit in the company of the Church according to the need of the moment. The Christian’s fundamental confidence, therefore, is not in a reliable epistemology but in a reliable God. God, Stackhouse argues, can be trusted to provide all one needs to accomplish one’s vocation—including the requisite knowledge. But one can hardly trust God for any more than that, and must instead recognize one’s finiteness, fallibility, and fallenness alongside every other human being. Indeed, Stackhouse takes into account the sociology of knowledge and the history of expert error to underscore the fragility of all knowledge claims.

In Can I Believe?, Stackhouse tries his hand at a sustained conversational apologetic for the “cultured despisers” of our time. The book flows in four parts. The first is a preliminary discussion of how one ought to decide among religious options. Is picking a religion like picking a refrigerator or a friend? This section sets the terms for the warrants later offered for the Christian religion. The second section attempts to lay to rest various misunderstandings of Christianity abroad in contemporary North American culture by telling the Christian Story (the Bible’s main narrative thread) in contemporary language. The third section surveys the wide range of grounds on which Christians defend their faith as intellectual responsible. And the fourth section briefly responds to the two most popular questions raised against Christian evangelism: the problem of particularism (Why Jesus instead of any other religious figure?) and the problem of evil. Stackhouse does not try to make Christianity smoothly palatable to the sophisticated reader. Instead, his main point is that the Christian religion, despite its lingering familiarity in the West, is much stranger than most of us realize—and yet it is the strangely shaped key that, as G. K. Chesterton asserted, fits the very strange lock of the world.

In Evangelicalism: A Very Short Introduction, Stackhouse surveys the history of evangelicalism from the eighteenth century to the present and around the globe (rather than focusing entirely on America or even the Anglosphere) to discuss what he calls a distinctive style of Protestant Christianity. He takes almost equal time to describe this style, revising David Bebbington’s famous definitional quadrilateral to suggest that evangelicalism can be identified by the following sextet of adjectives: Trinitarian, Biblicist, conversionist, missional, pragmatic, and populist. In doing so, Stackhouse attempts to show how Nigerian indigenous Christians, Korean Presbyterians, Brazilian Pentecostals, and Canadian Mennonites can plausibly all be called by the same term—in distinction from conservative and liberal alternative styles.

Authored books 

John G. Stackhouse Jr. (2018). Why You're Here: Ethics for the Real World. New York: Oxford University Press. .
John G. Stackhouse Jr. (2020). Can I Believe? Christianity for the Hesitant. New York: Oxford University Press. .
John G. Stackhouse Jr. (2022). Evangelicalism: A Very Short Introduction. New York: Oxford University Press. .

References

Footnotes

Works cited 
Bob Harvey, The Future of Religion: Interviews with Christians on the Brink (Novalis, 2001).
Canadian Who's Who (University of Toronto Press, 2019).

External links 

Crandall University web page
John Stackhouse Books and Audio
John Stackhouse's Weblog
Cardus interview

1960 births
Academics in New Brunswick
Canadian columnists
Canadian evangelicals
Christian scholars
Living people
Northwestern College (Iowa)
Queen's University at Kingston alumni
Academic staff of Regent College
University of Chicago alumni
Academic staff of the University of Manitoba
Wheaton College (Illinois) alumni
Writers from Kingston, Ontario